Ciconia nana  is an extinct species of stork from the Pliocene of Australia. It was originally described in 1888 by De Vis as Xenorhynchus nanus, based on fossil material from the Condamine River, near Chinchilla, in the Darling Downs region of Queensland. Additional material subsequently came from Cooper Creek in the eastern Lake Eyre Basin of northeastern South Australia. The form was provisionally transferred to Ciconia in 1982 and redescribed in 2005.

References

Fossil taxa described in 1888
nana
Pliocene birds
Neogene birds of Australia